1988 ACC tournament may refer to:

 1988 ACC men's basketball tournament
 1988 ACC women's basketball tournament
 1988 ACC men's soccer tournament
 1988 ACC women's soccer tournament
 1988 Atlantic Coast Conference baseball tournament